I cinque dell'Adamello (i. e. "The Five from the Adamello") is a 1954 Italian war drama film written and directed by Pino Mercanti and starring Fausto Tozzi and Nadia Gray.

Plot

Cast 

Fausto Tozzi as Leonida
Nadia Gray as Magda
Franco Balducci as  Renato
 Mario Colli as  Momi
 Dario Michaelis as  Pinin
Walter Santesso as  Piero
 Attilio Bossio as  Doschei
Saro Urzì as  Briscola
 Piera Simoni as  Rosina
 Rita Rosa as Mariolina
Guido Celano as  Don Romualdo
 Fedele Gentile as Captain Alvaro
 Mariolina Cappellano as  Lauretta
Dina Perbellini as  Piero's Mother
 Cristina Pall as The Marquise
Michele Malaspina as Piero's Father
Nino Marchesini as  Rector of the College

References

External links

Italian war drama films
1950s war drama films
Italian World War I films
Films directed by Pino Mercanti
1954 drama films
1954 films
1950s Italian films